Scott Edwards (born 23 August 1968) is an Australian rules footballer who played for the Fremantle Dockers between 1995 and 1996. He was drafted from Claremont in the WAFL as a foundation selection in the 1994 AFL draft and played mainly as a wingman.

External links

1968 births
Fremantle Football Club players
Claremont Football Club players
Living people
Australian rules footballers from Western Australia